Aa (pronounced "double a") is the debut studio album by American record producer Harry Rodrigues, under his alias Baauer, released by LuckyMe on March 18, 2016. It has guest features by Future, G-Dragon, Leikeli47, M.I.A., Novelist, Pusha T, Rustie, Tirzah and TT the Artist.

Background and recording

After Rodrigues' debut single, "Harlem Shake", spawned numerous Internet memes, he stated that "it became corny and annoying as fuck". He also stated: "I didn't want to be an EDM producer and I still don't want to be".

The album is named after Rodrigues' stage name, Baauer. He said: "I have two A's in my name, and also the first release I did on LuckyMe was ß, so this is gonna be Aa and in the future I'll do a U, and then ER".

Rodrigues recorded the album in Glasgow, Japan and the United Arab Emirates for "at least two years".

Music
Aa is an electronic, trap, bass and hip hop album. It is also influenced by M.I.A. and tribal music.

Artwork
The artwork was designed by Jonathan Zawada and Dominic Flannigan. It depicts a tree rising from an upturned motorcycle helmet, which is a reference to the "Harlem Shake" music videos.

Critical reception

At review aggregate site Metacritic, Aa has an average score of 76 out of 100, based on 11 reviews, indicating "generally favorable reviews".

Accolades

Track listing

Personnel
Credits for Aa.

 Baauer – producer, writer, recording
 Caleb Leven – vocal engineering
 Dominic Flannigan – design
 Future – vocals 
 G-Dragon – vocals  
 Joe LaPorta – mastering
 Johnatan Zawada – design
 Leikeli47 – vocals 
 Mason Klein – executive producer
 M.I.A. – vocals 
 Noah Beresin – production 
 Novelist – vocals 
 Pusha T – vocals 
 Rustie – guitar 
 Ryan Schwabe – mixing, vocal engineering
 Stewart Hawkes – mastering
 S-Type – additional production
 Tirzah – vocals 
 TT The Artist – vocals

Charts

References

2016 debut albums
Baauer albums
LuckyMe (record label) albums